Chris Eaton is a former police officer who has also overseen security and anti-corruption efforts in sports.  He is a well-known figure in the world of sports results manipulation and is sought worldwide for his opinion and feedback on program's aimed at tackling corruption in sport. He has worked in sport integrity at FIFA and INTERPOL and is currently the Sports Integrity Director at the International Centre for Sport Security.

Early life and education 

Born on 22 February 1952, Eaton attended Caulfield High School in Melbourne and later the Australian Graduate School of Police Management in Sydney. He went on to complete a graduate certificate at the Charles Sturt University in New South Wales.

Career 

Eaton has over 40 years' public service experience in the fields of international law enforcement, security and integrity.

The International Centre for Sport Security 

Eaton joined the International Centre for Sport Security in April 2012, a non-profit organisation led by President Mohammed Hanzab, Vice-President Mohammed Al Hajaj Shahwani and Executive Director, Helmut Spahn. Eaton has spoken out against a number of issues including the state of English football, match-fixing in Africa, the need for governmental involvement in match-fixing and general corruption in sport including the Indian Premier League. His primary role is to promote integrity reform in the sport industry and support the creation of international measures to combat integrity threats to sport.

FIFA 

In December 2010 Eaton was appointed as the security adviser to FIFA for the 2010 World Cup South Africa™, and later, FIFA's head of security, Eaton was responsible for all FIFA interests and assets against risk and threat and oversaw the development of an internal investigation program to target match-fixing and criminal behaviour within football. The program included managing a team of international investigators, a first for FIFA at the time. Eaton initiated unique institutional tools for sport to combat corruption in football, including a hotline and website in 180 languages, the offer of amnesties, rewards and rehabilitation for anyone who revealed important information. The introduction of these tools was delayed when FIFA came under independent governance scrutiny. Eaton saw many in the worldwide sporting industry punished for profiting from the illegal betting industry with ongoing match-fixing investigations in about 50 countries, due in part to his global law enforcement contacts and forceful approach. His resignation was a setback for the infamous Asiagate scandal as Eaton was also instrumental in the arrest of the Singaporean man at the center of the match-fixing debacle, Wilson Raj Perumal.

INTERPOL 

In 1999 Eaton was sent by the Australian Federal Police to the International Criminal Police Organization (INTERPOL), where he was eventually responsible for running INTERPOL's 24/7 Command and Coordination Centre, the global, operational, monitoring hub of INTERPOL. During this period Eaton was also seconded from INTERPOL as a senior UN Special Investigator with the Independent Inquiry Committee, managing international investigations of allegations of fraud and corruption within the United Nations' Oil-for-Food Program in Iraq.

Police service 

Eaton began his career, in 1969, with the Victoria police, a state police service in Australia, transferring five years later to then Commonwealth Police, which later renamed the Australian Federal Police. Eaton served as a federal agent and also spent over 10 years as the National Secretary of the Australian Federal Police Association, the professional representative body of federal police employees, during which time he called for the abolition of the National Crime Authority. He is a recipient of the Australian Police Medal.

Personal 
Eaton is married with six children (two sons and four daughters) and two grandchildren.  He currently resides in Doha, Qatar.

References

External links 
http://www.theicss.org The International Centre for Sport Security page
http://www.fifa.com/ FIFA page
http://www.interpol.int/ Interpol page

Australian police officers
Interpol officials
1952 births
Living people